Aiskew Roman villa is a Roman villa in Aiskew, North Yorkshire, England. It was identified by geophysical survey in July 2013 and partly excavated between November 2014 and February 2015.

Discovery
The villa was discovered in 2013 by a geophysical survey of the site in advance of construction of the Bedale, Aiskew, and Leeming Bar bypass. The site was excavated by Pre-construct archaeology. There was no prior indication of a villa at this site and Peter Rowe, North Yorkshire's County Archaeologist described the discovery as "a surprise, it was a shock". Only a small part of the villa complex was excavated during this scheme, with over 95% of it reportedly left undisturbed.

Interpretation

The villa is of the 'winged -corridor' type and has a long central range with a 'wing' at each end. It dates to the 3rd and 4th centuries AD. One of the rooms at the north-east end included an opus signinum floor. A room with a hypocaust was also included at the north wing. Finds from the site include a silver stylus, a stamped amphora rim from north Africa, Nene Valley Colour Coated Ware, and samian ware. It was constructed over a pre-existing field system and an enclosure dating to the late Iron Age to early Roman period.

References 

Villas in Roman Britain
Archaeological sites in North Yorkshire
Roman sites in North Yorkshire
2013 archaeological discoveries
3rd-century establishments in Roman Britain